Amblypodia is a genus of butterflies in the family Lycaenidae. Several species formerly placed here are now in Arhopala and Flos, although this placement is not necessarily definite.

The remaining species of Amblypodia are:

 Amblypodia anita – purple leaf blue
 Amblypodia annetta
 Amblypodia narada

The species of this genus are found in the Indomalayan realm (mainly) and the Australasian realm.

References

 
 

 
Amblypodiini
Lycaenidae genera
Taxa named by Thomas Horsfield